Emamzadeh Qasem (also Romanized as Emāmzādeh Qāsem, Emamzadeh Ghasem, and Imāmzādeh Qāsim) is a village in Japelaq-e Sharqi Rural District, Japelaq District, Azna County, Lorestan Province, Iran. At the 2006 census, its population was 258, in 81 families.

References 

Towns and villages in Azna County